Peter Bebjak (born 1970 in Czechoslovakia) is a Slovak actor, director, producer and writer. In 2001, and along with Rastislav Šesták, he established DNA Production company.

Filmography

Cinema

Notes
A  Also credited as writer.

Television

See also
 List of Slovak submissions for the Academy Award for Best Foreign Language Film

References

General
 
 
Specific

External links 
 

1970 births
Living people
People from Partizánske
20th-century Slovak male actors
Slovak film directors
Slovak male film actors
21st-century Slovak male actors
Slovak male television actors
Date of birth missing (living people)